Romy and Michele's High School Reunion is a 1997 American comedy film directed by David Mirkin and starring Mira Sorvino, Lisa Kudrow, and Janeane Garofalo. The plot revolves around two 28-year-old girls who appear to have not achieved much success in life, and decide to invent fake careers to impress former classmates at their ten-year high school reunion. The characters are taken from the stage play Ladies Room, which also featured Kudrow.

The film received positive reviews from critics and is considered a cult classic.

Plot
Two 28-year-old girls, Romy White and Michele Weinberger, live together in an apartment in Venice, Los Angeles, California. Romy works as a cashier in the service department at a Jaguar dealership and Michele is unemployed. They are single, unambitious, and enjoy a casual lifestyle of slacking, mocking TV and movies, and elaborate amateur dressmaking. While working, Romy encounters her former classmate from high school, Heather Mooney, once a rebellious, troubled girl who frequently smoked cigarettes in school, who is now a businesswoman, having invented the paper of a special type of cigarette. Heather informs Romy about their upcoming ten-year high school reunion in Tucson, Arizona.

As high school students in 1987, Romy and Michele were continually bullied by the "A-Group", a small group of popular, yet mean, girls, led by cheerleader Christie Masters, who humiliated them repeatedly. Romy also had a crush on Christie’s boyfriend, athlete Billy Christianson. Heather was in love with a geek named Sandy Frink, but Sandy had a crush on Michele. Heather often blew off steam by bullying a girl called Toby Walters. Finally, at the prom, Romy asked Billy if he would dance with her. Though he agreed, when he spoke to Christie about it, she decided to take advantage of the situation. Christie tricked Romy and Michele into thinking Billy was in love with Romy, and had dumped Christie to be with her. Romy waited all night to dance with Billy, who had already left with Christie. Michele danced with her instead.

Romy realizes that their lack of achievements will not make a good impression at the reunion. Desperate to impress their former classmates, Romy and Michele make last-ditch attempts to improve themselves, hoping to avoid being bullied again.

Romy tries to find boyfriends for her and Michele by going to different gyms, to no avail. Michele applies for well-paid, difficult jobs but fails to get the two of them hired. In the end, they decide to fake success by showing up in an expensive car and business suits. Romy borrows a Jaguar XJ-S from a co-worker, and Michele makes their outfits. En route to the reunion, they decide to claim that they invented the Post-it Note, believing that no one will know better. They confront over the details of their lie, which escalates into an argument about their friendship. They decide to go their separate ways once they reach the reunion.

At the reunion, Michele hears Romy claiming that she invented Post-its by herself. Michele convinces the A-Group she invented a special kind of glue. Sandy Frink, the nerd who had a crush on Michele in high school, has become wealthy and attractive since high school, and hits on Michele after hitting her with his limo. Billy and Romy reunite and hit it off. Both Romy and Michele win awards as the "Most Changed For the Better Since High School" members of their graduating class, but still refuse to speak with each other. Seventy years later, an elderly Michele learns that Romy is on her deathbed, and calls her to make amends. However, they rehash the same argument and Romy dies without resolving their issues.

Michele wakes up alone in the Jaguar, realizing that she was dreaming. At the reunion, Romy starts to tell the Post-it story to the A-group, who are all pregnant. Christie Masters is now a mother of two children, (with a third on the way) and married to Billy, who she says works in real estate. Heather arrives (hoping to seduce Sandy Frink) and Christie mentions Romy’s Post-it story, but Heather blows the lie by revealing the real inventor's name. Christie and her friends taunt Romy, and Michele ineptly defends her. Romy runs out, and Michele chases after her. They reconcile and decide to be themselves instead of trying to impress other people. They change into brightly colored homemade outfits and return to the reunion.

They confront Christie, who makes fun of their clothes. A-Group girl Lisa Luder, who lost touch with the A-group after high school and has changed for the better, is now a fashion editor, and announces that the outfits are actually "not bad". Christie verbally attacks Lisa, who coolly dismisses and mocks her. The other A-Group girls abandon Christie, while everyone else congratulates Romy and Michele. Heather apologizes to Romy and Michele for ruining their story, and admits she was miserable in high school because Sandy was in love with Michele, and didn’t even want to be friends with her. She also mentions that she had no idea Romy and Michele were so badly bullied by the A-group, thinking their lives were perfect. Romy and Michele comfort her by reminding her that she was always successful at making Toby Walters miserable. Just at that moment, Toby asks Heather if she will sign her yearbook as she never did in high school. After Toby admits Heather upset her when they were teenagers, Heather is amazed and happily agrees to sign Toby’s yearbook.

Sandy, who turns out to be an actual billionaire, arrives via helicopter. He confesses that he still loves Michele and asks her to dance with him. Michele agrees, as long as Romy can dance with them. After their interpretive dance to Cyndi Lauper's "Time After Time" they receive huge applause, Sandy escorts them to his helicopter. On their way out, they encounter Billy. Once a muscular and handsome athlete, he is now an overweight alcoholic, has a dead-end job working for Christie's father, and is unsure if he is the father of her latest pregnancy. He hits on Romy, who tells him to wait for her in his hotel room. As revenge for making her feel so insecure because of the Prom trick, she plans to do the exact same thing to him. She then leaves the reunion with Michele as the two girls join Sandy in his helicopter. The reunion guests watch as the helicopter takes off.

Six months later, back in Los Angeles, Romy and Michele use money loaned to them by Sandy to open a successful fashion boutique with their homemade designs.

Cast

Production

Development 
The Romy and Michele characters first appeared in the 1988 stage play Ladies Room, which was written by Robin Schiff. Schiff was in the comedy troupe The Groundlings with Lisa Kudrow, who starred in the play as Michele opposite Christie Mellor as Romy. Schiff said her inspiration for the characters of Romy and Michele “were loosely based, just visually, on these girls I used to see going into a club on Sunset Blvd. You'd see these two friends, and they looked like they got dressed together and were wearing different versions of the same thing."

Ladies Room was then adapted into a sitcom pilot called Just Temporary, with Kudrow and Mellor reprising their roles, but the pilot was not picked up. Around this time, film executives at the Disney subsidiary Touchstone came across Schiff's play while "looking for a ‘female version of Wayne's World'." Schiff was initially reluctant to adapt the play into a film, thinking some scenes would not transfer well to a movie. After Schiff pondered about what it might be like if Romy and Michele were invited to their high school reunion ("…And it wasn't until they fill out the questionnaire when they realize their lives hadn't amounted to anything. That seemed funny to me.") Schiff began work on the script, which she would spend the next five years developing. Schiff based the characters' friendship partly on her relationship with her best friend. “One day we were stuck on a plane on a tarmac, and started reading the Sky Mall catalog and laughing our asses off. That was the kind of friend you want to hang out with—that even stuck on a plane on the tarmac you can still have fun."

Casting 
Kudrow's rising stardom from the show Friends played a part in the film successfully getting through the development stage. Toni Collette was a strong contender for the role of Romy and met with director David Mirkin. The studio offered the role to Mira Sorvino, who at that point was about to win a Best Supporting Actress Oscar for the film Mighty Aphrodite. Said Mirkin, “It was definitely a long shot, but I heard she wanted to meet so we had lunch, and I instantly knew that she could do it. Romy and Michele were conceived as one tall and one short, but I loved the idea of Lisa and Mira playing this idiot blonde power couple.”

Filming 
Filming took place between April and June 1996 in Los Angeles. Exterior shots of Romy and Michele's fictional Sagebrush High School were filmed in Santa Clarita. $240,000 of the film's $20 million budget was spent on securing the licensing rights for the song “Time After Time” by Cyndi Lauper. Mona May, who served as the costume designer for Clueless, provided the film's outfits.

Touchstone initially found David Mirkin's final cut of the film to be too quirky and wanted to sweeten the tone, but Mirkin insisted on keeping the edgier tone.

Release

Box office 
The film opened at number two in the North American box office, making $7.4 million in its opening weekend, finishing behind Volcano. It grossed a total of $29 million in North America. In the United States, it was released the same month as Grosse Pointe Blank, another 1980s-themed high school reunion film that Disney was involved with.

Critical response 
On Rotten Tomatoes, the film holds an approval rating of 75% based on 63 reviews, with an average rating of 6.20/10. The site's critics consensus reads: "Romy and Michele's High School Reunion has an admittedly slight premise, but it's elevated by ample heart, an infectiously playful spirit, and the buoyant chemistry of Lisa Kudrow and Mira Sorvino." On Metacritic, the film has a weighted average score of 59 out of 100, based on 18 critics, indicating "mixed or average reviews". Audiences polled by CinemaScore gave the film an average grade of "C" on an A+ to F scale.

Roger Ebert gave the film three out of four stars, declaring, "Romy and Michele's High School Reunion, written by Robin Schiff (based on her play) and directed by David Mirkin, is one of the brightest and goofiest comedies in a while, a film that has a share of truth, but isn't afraid to cut loose with the weirdest choreography I have seen outside a 1960s revival.”

Janet Maslin of The New York Times wrote the “candy-colored 'Romy and Michele's High School Reunion’ [is] cheerful, giddy fun” and praised the two female leads, saying “Ms. Kudrow and Ms. Sorvino make a fine team, elevating bubble-headedness to new levels of comic ingenuity.” Jack Mathews of the Los Angeles Times said "beneath the endless silliness of the movie beats a real heart, and its theme of loyal friendship keeps propping it up every time the thin walls of the story seem about to collapse.” Mathews also praised "the dead-pan performances of Sorvino and Kudrow...Romy and Michelle are cartoon characters, but the actresses make them both real and enormously sympathetic."

Accolades 

The film won and was nominated for a number of awards throughout 1998.

Home media 
Romy and Michele's High School Reunion was released on DVD on August 24, 1999. It was also reissued as a special edition Blu-ray for the film's 15th anniversary in 2012.

Legacy
Though a modest success at the box office, the film steadily gained a cult following through home video and repeat cable TV airings since its release.

In 2005, Romy and Michele: In the Beginning, a prequel television film written and directed by Robin Schiff, premiered on ABC Family. Katherine Heigl played Romy and Alexandra Breckenridge starred as Michele.

A musical adaptation premiered at the 5th Avenue Theatre in Seattle, Washington in June 2017. The musical was directed by Kristin Hanggi, director of Broadway's Rock of Ages, while actors Cortney Wolfson and Stephanie Renee Wall portrayed Romy and Michele, respectively. Orange Is the New Black and Weeds composers Gwendolyn Sanford and Brandon Jay wrote the music and lyrics to songs including “Business Woman Special,” “10 Years,” “I Invented Post-Its,” and “Changing Lives One Outfit at a Time.”

Soundtrack

Two soundtrack albums featuring music from Romy and Michele's High School Reunion were released in 1997 courtesy of Hollywood Records. The first album, titled "Original Soundtrack", was made available ten days before the official North American film release, while the second album, "More Music From the Motion Picture", was released four months later. Due to copyright issues, several songs which featured in the film, did not appear on either soundtrack album; songs omitted include the film's opening song "Just a Girl" by No Doubt, "Y.M.C.A." by Village People, "Addicted to Love" by Robert Palmer, "Time After Time" by Cyndi Lauper, "Ain't No Love (Ain't No Use)" by Sub Sub, featuring Melanie Williams, "Footloose" by Kenny Loggins, "Hello Trouble" by The Desert Rose Band, "Don't Get Me Wrong" by The Pretenders and "Have a Good Time" by Talawah Crew. Both albums were reissued as a 2-CD set as part of the Double Features series.

 Original Soundtrack

 More Music from the Motion Picture

See also
List of cult films

References

External links

 
 
 
 

1997 films
1990s buddy comedy films
1990s female buddy films
American buddy comedy films
American female buddy films
American films based on plays
Class reunions in popular culture
Films about proms
Films directed by David Mirkin
Films produced by Laurence Mark
Films scored by Steve Bartek
Films set in 1987
Films set in 1997
Films set in Los Angeles
Films set in Tucson, Arizona
Films shot in Los Angeles
Touchstone Pictures films
1997 directorial debut films
1997 comedy films
1990s feminist films
1990s English-language films
1990s American films